Cryptaulax elegans is a species of cryptomonads in the order Cryptomonadales and the family Cryptomonadaceae. It was found in tropical marine sediments.

References

External links 

 
 Cryptaulax elegans at Biolib.cz

Protists described in 1990
Cryptomonads